List of handball clubs in Saudi Arabia sorted by division:

Al-Arabi
Mudhar
Al-Noor
Al-Ahli
Al-Khaleej

 
Saudi Arabia
Handball